Arthur Paul John James Charles Gore, 7th Earl of Arran (31 July 1903 – 28 December 1958), styled Viscount Sudley until shortly before his death, was an Anglo-Irish peer, author and translator.

Biography 
Gore was born in St Pancras, London, the first of two sons born to Lt-Col Arthur Gore, 6th Earl of Arran and Maud Jacqueline Marie Beauclerk, only daughter of 3rd Baron Huyssen van Kattendyke of Kattendijke, Zeeland, Holland. 

He was educated at Winchester College and New College, Oxford. Commissioned as a lieutenant in the Essex Regiment, he served as aide-de-camp (1931–32) to George Villiers, 6th Earl of Clarendon, Governor-General of the Union of South Africa.

Work as author and translator 
Nicknamed "Pauly," he was the author of William, or More Loved than Loving, first published in 1933 by Collins, republished in 1956 by Chapman & Hall, in an edition with illustrations by Osbert Lancaster and an introduction by Evelyn Waugh. He was a translator of French and German texts. His translation of The Three Musketeers, under the name Lord Sudley, was published by Penguin in 1952.

He succeeded to the title Earl of Arran of the Arran Islands upon the death of his father on 19 December 1958, but never took his seat in the House of Lords. He committed suicide on 28 December 1958, just nine days after the death of his father, at Poltimore, Devon. Aged 55, Arran was unmarried, and reportedly killed himself because he was homosexual.

Following his death, a schoolmate eulogised him in The Times:

References

1903 births
British people of Dutch descent
Arthur
People educated at Winchester College
Alumni of New College, Oxford
LGBT peers
English LGBT politicians
British politicians who committed suicide
Earls of Arran (Ireland)
People from St Pancras, London
1958 suicides
LGBT military personnel